Milad Kermani is an Iranian football winger.

Club career

Steel Azin
He started his career with Steel Azin in Division 1.

Naft Tehran
Kermani joined Naft Tehran in summer 2012 while he mostly played in Tehran Asia Vision U-21 Super League. He made his debut for Naft Tehran against Malavan as a substitute for Yaghoub Karimi in August 2012.

Paykan
After a season with Naft Tehran, he re-united with his father at Paykan. He helped Paykan to promote to Pro League with 15 appearances and one goal.

Saipa
Kermani joined to Saipa in summer 2014. He only made 2 appearances for Saipa before he was released from the club on November 29, 2014.

Esteghlal
On 9 December 2014, he joined Esteghlal.

Club career statistics

References

External links
 Milad Kermani at PersianLeague.com
 Milad Kermani at IranLeague.ir
 

Living people
Iranian footballers
Steel Azin F.C. players
Naft Tehran F.C. players
Paykan F.C. players
Saipa F.C. players
Esteghlal F.C. players
1992 births
Association football midfielders